The 1968 Illinois earthquake (a New Madrid event) was the largest recorded earthquake in the U.S. Midwestern state of Illinois. Striking at 11:02 am on November 9, it measured 5.4 on the Richter scale. Although no fatalities occurred, the event caused considerable structural damage to buildings, including the toppling of chimneys and shaking in Chicago, the region's largest city. In studying its cause, scientists discovered the Cottage Grove Fault in the Southern Illinois Basin.

Within the region, millions felt the rupture. Reactions to the earthquake varied; some people near the epicenter did not react to the shaking, while others panicked. A future earthquake in the region is extremely likely; in 2005, seismologists and geologists estimated a 90% chance of a magnitude 6–7 tremor before 2055, likely originating in the Wabash Valley seismic zone on the Illinois–Indiana border or the New Madrid fault zone.

Background 
The first recorded earthquake in Illinois is from 1795 when a small earthquake shook the frontier settlement of Kaskaskia, although the epicenter could not be located and may have been outside Illinois. Data from large earthquakes—in May and July 1909, and November 1968—suggest that earthquakes in the area are of moderate magnitude but can be felt over a large geographical area, largely because of the lack of fault lines. Contradicting the idea that the region's earthquakes are felt over a wide area, a 1965 shock was only noticed near Tamms, though it had the same intensity level (VII) as those of 1909 and 1968. Before 1968, earthquakes had been recorded in 1838, 1857, 1876, 1881, 1882, 1883, 1887, 1891, 1903, 1905, 1912, 1917, 1922, 1934, 1939, 1947, 1953, 1955, and 1958. Since 1968, other earthquakes have occurred in the same region in 1972, 1974, 1984, and 2008.

Geology 

The quake struck on Saturday, November 9, 1968, at 11:02 am. Surrounding the epicenter were several small towns built on flat glacial lake plains and low hills. Scientists described the rupture as "strong". During the quake, surface wave and body wave magnitudes were measured at 5.2 and 5.54, respectively. The magnitude of the quake reached 5.4 on the Richter scale.

A fault plane solution for the earthquake confirmed two nodal planes (one is always a fault plane, the other an auxiliary plane) striking north–south and dipping about 45° to the east and to the west. This faulting suggests dip slip reverse motion and a horizontal east–west axis of confining stress. The rupture also partly occurred on the New Madrid Fault, responsible for the great New Madrid earthquakes in 1812. The New Madrid tremors were the most powerful earthquakes to hit the contiguous United States.

Various theories were put forward for the cause of the rupture. Donald Roll, director of seismology at Loyola University Chicago, proposed that the quake was caused by massive amounts of silt being deposited by rivers, generating a "seesaw" effect on the plates beneath. "The weight of the silt depressed one end of the block and tipped up the other," he said. Scientists eventually realized, though, that the cause was a then-unknown fault, the Cottage Grove Fault, a small tear in the Earth's rock in the Southern Illinois Basin near the city of Harrisburg, Illinois.

The fault, which is aligned east–west, is connected to the north–south-trending Wabash Valley Fault System at its eastern end. Seismographic mapping completed by geologists revealed monoclines, anticlines, and synclines, all of which suggest deformation during the Paleozoic era, when strike-slip faulting took place nearby. The fault runs along an ancient Precambrian terrane boundary. It was active mainly in the Late Pennsylvanian and Early Permian epochs around 300 million years ago.

Damage 

The shaking extended east to Pennsylvania and West Virginia, south to Mississippi and Alabama, north to Toronto, Ontario, Canada, and west to Oklahoma. Isolated reports were received from Boston, Mobile, Alabama, Pensacola, Florida, southern Ontario, Arkansas, Minnesota, Tennessee, Georgia, Kansas, Ohio, Mississippi, Kentucky, North Carolina, South Carolina, Missouri, West Virginia, Alabama, Nebraska, Iowa, Oklahoma, South Dakota, Pennsylvania, Michigan, and Wisconsin, presumably because of shaking. The worst-affected areas were in the general area of Evansville, Indiana, St. Louis, and Chicago, but with no major damage. No deaths happened; the worst injury was a child knocked unconscious by falling debris outside his home.

Damage was confined to Illinois, Indiana, Kentucky, Tennessee, and south-central Iowa, and largely consisted of fallen chimneys, foundation cracks, collapsed parapets, and overturned tombstones. In one home in Dale, Illinois, near Tuckers Corners and southwest of McLeansboro, the quake cracked interior walls, plaster, and chimneys. Using a type of victim study, the local post office surveyed residents and implemented a field inspection, which indicated the strongest shaking (MM VII) took place in the Wabash Valley, Ohio Valley, and other nearby south-central Illinois lowlands. Outside this four-state zone, oscillating objects, including cars, chimneys, and the Gateway Arch, were reported to authorities.

McLeansboro in particular experienced minor damage over an extensive area. Its local high school reported 19 broken windows in the girls' gymnasium, along with cracked plaster walls. Most of the high school's classrooms sustained fractured walls. The façade of the town's First United Methodist Church was damaged, and a brick and concrete block fell off the top. The Hamilton County Courthouse withstood several structural cracks, including one on the ceiling above the judge's seat. The town's residents also reported collapsing chimneys; three chimneys toppled at one home, leading to further damage.

Most of the buildings that experienced chimney damage were 30 to 50 years old. Moderate damage—including broken chimneys and fractured walls—occurred in towns in south-central Illinois, southwest Indiana, and northwest Kentucky.

The quake damaged the town's water tower, which began to leak  of water an hour.

Donald Roll correctly predicted the earthquake would have no aftershocks. He later said, "That was kind of a safety valve. The pressure [that] has been built up has been released." He also described the earthquake as "a very rare occurrence".

Response 
Millions in the area experienced the earthquake, the first major seismic event in decades. Following the tremor, businesses in the area emptied. Many residents did not believe that the earthquake was over magnitude 5. Others did not realize an earthquake was taking place, for example, some residents thought their furnaces had exploded, and one man thought that the shaking was caused by his son "jumping up and down". At the Suntone Factory in McLeansboro,  from the epicenter, workers rushed out of the building, thinking a  water tank inside had fallen.

People's reactions varied; some described themselves as "shocked"; others admitted to being "shaky" or nervous for the rest of the day. Harold Kittinger, a worker at the Suntone Factory, said, "I do not care to tell anyone I was frightened. But I was not shaking in my shoes. My shoes were moving." One woman hypothesized that the shaking was a "bomb". Grace Standerfer suggested the earthquake was sudden, saying, "I was just scared to death. My husband and I were in the house. The Venetian shades began to shake one way, then another. When that awful blast came, he grabbed me and we ran outside. Things were falling and breaking in the house. I said to him, 'This is it.' I thought the world had come to an end. Outside, wires were moving. There was no wind. The ground was quivering under our feet. I was so scared. I did not know I was scared." People in the community of Mount Vernon, Illinois, were frightened by the shaking. However, some did not notice the earthquake; Jane Bessen said her party was "in a car ... to Evansville and didn't know about it until we got there".

Future threats 
In 2005, scientists determined that a 90% probability existed of a magnitude 6–7 earthquake occurring in the New Madrid area during the next 50 years. This could cause potentially high damage in the Chicago metropolitan area, which has a population near 10 million people. Pressure on the fault where the 1811–1812 Madrid earthquakes occurred was believed to be increasing, but a later study by Eric Calais of Purdue University and other experts concluded the land adjacent to the New Madrid fault was moving less than  a year, increasing the span between expected earthquakes on the fault to 500–1,000 years. Scientists anticipating a future earthquake suggest the Wabash Valley Fault as a possible source, calling it "dangerous".

Douglas Wiens, a professor of earth and planetary sciences, reported: "The strongest earthquakes in the last few years have come from the Wabash Valley Fault", and said the fault needs more scientific observation. Steven Obermeir of the United States Geological Survey is one of several scientists who have found sediments suggesting Wabash Valley Fault earthquakes around magnitude 7 on the Richter scale. Michael Wyssession, an associate professor of earth and planetary sciences, denigrated the Madrid fault zone and said, "in 20 years there have been three magnitude 5 or better earthquakes on the Wabash Valley Fault. There is evidence that sometime in the past, the Wabash Valley Fault has produced as strong as magnitude 7 earthquakes. On the other hand, the New Madrid Fault has been very quiet for a long time now. Clearly, the Wabash Valley Fault has gotten our deserved attention."

See also 
List of earthquakes in 1968
List of earthquakes in Illinois

Notes 
  Two earthquakes occurred during this year.
  Three earthquakes took place during this year.
  From other sources, the focal depth was 12 mi (19 km).

References

Further reading

1968 earthquakes
1968 natural disasters in the United States
1968 Illinois
1968 Illinois
1968 Illinois
1968 Illinois